The Almond and the Seahorse is a 2022 British independent drama film directed by Celyn Jones and Tom Stern and written by Jones and Kaite O'Reilly, based on O'Reilly's 2008 stage play of the same name. The film stars Trine Dyrholm, Meera Syal, Rebel Wilson and Charlotte Gainsbourg.

The film premiered at the Zurich Film Festival on 26 September 2022.

Plot
Follows the lives of two couples who deal with their loved ones who suffer from anterograde amnesia.

Cast
 Rebel Wilson as Sarah
 Charlotte Gainsbourg as Toni
 Trine Dyrholm as Gwen
 Celyn Jones as Joe
 Meera Syal as Dr. Falmer

Production
In October 2020, it was announced that screenwriter and actor Celyn Jones and cinematographer Tom Stern would make their directorial debuts on The Almond and the Seahorse, a film adaptation of the stage play by Kaite O'Reilly, who also wrote the screenplay with Jones. Rebel Wilson would star in her first non-comedy film role, and Jones would also be part of the cast, reprising a role he performed in the play. In December, Charlotte Gainsbourg joined the cast.

In April 2021, it was reported that Trine Dyrholm and Meera Syal had joined the cast, and that principal photography was underway in Merseyside, England, and North Wales. Gruff Rhys will compose the film's score.

Release 
The film premiered at the Zurich Film Festival on 26 September 2022. It was released in select theatres and VOD platforms on December 16, 2022.

Reception 
On review aggregator site Rotten Tomatoes, the film has an 8% approval rating based on 12 reviews, with an average rating of 4.3/10. Metacritic reports a 42 out of 100 rating, based on four critics, indicating "mixed or average reviews".

References

External links
 

2022 directorial debut films
2022 drama films
2022 independent films
British films based on plays
British drama films
British independent films
Fictional couples
Films shot in Merseyside
Films shot in Wales